Transport Fever is a business simulation game developed by Urban Games and published by Gambitious Digital Entertainment. It is the second video game of the  Transport Fever franchise, and was available worldwide for Microsoft Windows and macOS on 8 November 2016.

Gameplay
Like its predecessor Train Fever, Transport Fever focuses on traffic simulation, but offers more varieties of transport vehicles, including buses, trains, ships and planes. The game starts in 1850 and allows players to play until the modern days, experiencing the transportation history stretching more than 150 years. New and better transport vehicles will be released gradually until the year 2014. The game also features American and European campaigns, with each provides seven challenges by telling the historical context of the 19th and 20th century.

Development and release
Transport Fever was revealed in April 2016. It was developed by Urban Games, which was the developer of the Transport Fever franchise. The game was released on 8 November 2016 worldwide for Microsoft Windows.

Reception

Transport Fever received "fairly positive" reviews, according to review aggregator Metacritic.

The game scores an overall 7 points from TheSixthAxis, which suggests the game "great attention to detail", and praises the campaign mode is a good new content to enjoy. However, the cluttered UI system, inflexible roads and tracks placements and occasional bug would likely to make players lose their interests.

Sergio Brinkhuis of Hooked Gamers writes that in comparison to its predecessor Train Fever, the game improved in almost every term of aspects. However, time progression in the game is a bit off. He also criticises the time system that "travel time versus distance is completely out of whack and a day in the game lasts mere seconds."

The highest score among the thirteen reviews comes from GameStar. Benjamin Danneberg praises that the game offers better cargo systems and good new transports, but the controls are still flawed.

References

External links
 

2016 video games
Business simulation games
MacOS games
Single-player video games
Transport Fever
Transport simulation games
Video games developed in Switzerland
Video games using procedural generation
Windows games